Oceanville is an unincorporated community located within Galloway Township in Atlantic County, New Jersey, United States. Oceanville has a post office with ZIP code 08231.

From 1983–2016, Oceanville was the site of the Noyes Museum, the only fine arts museum in Atlantic County. The museum became part of Stockton University in 2016 and the site in Oceanville will be sold by the foundation that owns the property.

Demographics

Education
Oceanville, like other parts of the township, is zoned to Galloway Township School District (GTPS) (K-8) and Absegami High School of the Greater Egg Harbor Regional High School District.

Oceanville Kindergarten Learning Center was formerly in the community. Formerly Oceanville School, the building opened around 1927.  It closed in 2010. The facility now houses GTPS facilities such as the food service department.

References

Galloway Township, New Jersey
Unincorporated communities in Atlantic County, New Jersey
Unincorporated communities in New Jersey